The Roman Catholic Diocese of El Banco is a diocese located in the town of El Banco in the ecclesiastical province of Barranquilla in Colombia.

History
 17 January 2006: Established as Diocese of El Banco from the Diocese of Santa Marta and Diocese of Valledupar

Ordinaries
Jaime Enrique Duque Correa, M.X.Y. (January 17, 2006 – April 14, 2013)
Luis Gabriel Ramírez Díaz (June 18, 2014 – January 8, 2023)

See also
Roman Catholicism in Colombia

Sources

External links
 Catholic Hierarchy
 GCatholic.org

Roman Catholic dioceses in Colombia
Roman Catholic Ecclesiastical Province of Barranquilla
Christian organizations established in 2006
Roman Catholic dioceses and prelatures established in the 21st century